Bitaunioceras is a genus of Permian orthocerids with a gradually expanding,  straight, orthodontic shell with straight transverse sutures and a small, subcentral siphuncle with straight tubular orthochromatic necks.

The shell surface of Bitaunioceras has a few, shallow, rounded constrictions and numerous, unequal, prominent transverse wire-like lirae.

Bitaunioceras species have been found in Texas in the United States, Coahuila in Mexico, Sicily, Timor, and the south Urals in Russia.

References

 Sweet, Walter C. 1964. Nautiloidea-Orthocerida. Treatise on Invertebrate Paleontology, Part K. Geological Soc of America, and Univ Kansas Press.

Prehistoric nautiloid genera